San Francesco is a Romanesque-Gothic-style, Roman Catholic church located in Tolentino, province of Macerata, region of the Marche.

History
The church was erected in the 13th century. Some frescoes from this century remain; they appear to originate from Riminese artists. Among the frescoes moved here, a Madonna and child from the church of San Giacomo, Attributed to the Master of the Dormition of Terni.

References

Churches in Tolentino
Gothic architecture in le Marche
13th-century Roman Catholic church buildings in Italy